Bitflu  is an open-source,  BitTorrent client by Adrian Ulrich. It is available for Unix-like systems and is written in Perl.

Features 
 Multiple downloads
 IPv6 Support
 Designed to run as a daemon/No GUI: You can connect to the client via telnet and/or http (AJAX)
 Security: The client can chroot itself and drop privileges
 Bandwidth shaping (upload+download)
 Crash-Proof design: Crashes or a full filesystem will never corrupt your downloads again :-)
 Non-Threading/Non-Forking: All connections are handled in non-blocking state using epoll (or kqueue on *BSD)

Reception
Bitflu has received good reviews, both in open-source software sites  and blogs, praising it for being lightweight and feature-complete.

Even so, Bitflu seems to be largely unknown, reportedly commanding only 0.000025% of the total BitTorrent traffic. According to one reviewer, this could be due to its non-automated, relatively elaborated install procedure, which could be putting off a "majority of users who can't do anything more complicated than a click-next-until-finish install".

See also 
 Comparison of BitTorrent clients

References

External links
 

2009 software
Free BitTorrent clients
Unix Internet software